Thorpe is a village and civil parish in the Craven district of North Yorkshire, England. The population of the parish was estimated at 40 in 2010. At the 2011 the population remained less than 100. Details are included in the civil parish of Burnsall.

References

External links

Villages in North Yorkshire
Civil parishes in North Yorkshire
Wharfedale